Hapsidophrys is a genus of snakes of the family Colubridae.

Species
 Hapsidophrys lineatus Fischer, 1856
 Hapsidophrys principis (Boulenger, 1906)
 Hapsidophrys smaragdinus (Schlegel, 1837)

References

Hapsidophrys
Snake genera